Carozza is a surname. Notable people with the surname include:

 Antonello Carozza (born 1985), Italian singer-songwriter
 Mary Beth Carozza (born 1961), American politician
 Paul Carozza (born 1966), Australian rugby player

See also
 Carrozza, racehorse
 Carrozza (surname)

Italian-language surnames